is a prefectural museum in Tokushima, Japan, dedicated to the nature, archaeology, history, folklore, and art of Tokushima Prefecture. It first opened in 1959 and reopened in new premises in 1990.

See also

 List of Historic Sites of Japan (Tokushima)
 Awa Province (Tokushima)

References

External links
 Guide to the Collection
  Database of Collection

Museums in Tokushima Prefecture
Tokushima (city)
History museums in Japan
Prefectural museums
Museums established in 1959
1959 establishments in Japan